Capitan Prat usually refers to Chilean navy officer Arturo Prat. It may also refer to:

 Capitán Prat Province, Chile
 Captain Arturo Prat Base, a Chilean research station in the South Shetland Islands
 Chilean ship Capitán Prat, several ships with the name